Student lounges are rooms located within schools, colleges and universities, designed to give students a space for relaxation and study.

Design contest
The University of Texas held a contest to design its student lounges. The design of some student lounges have even won awards for the architects for their creations.

Impact
A 2003 study on the success of female physics majors found that the existence of a well-maintained student lounge was a marker of high success rates. Several studies conducted regarding gossip patterns have chosen the student lounge as an excellent choice for an unregulated environment. It has been noted that distance-learning courses should strive to provide a similar environment for casual conversation.

See also
 Common room
 Student activity center

References

Rooms
Lounge